Ingvar Lindberg (12 June 1911 – 17 April 1970) was a Swedish speed skater. He competed in three events at the 1932 Winter Olympics.

References

External links
 

1911 births
1970 deaths
Swedish male speed skaters
Olympic speed skaters of Sweden
Speed skaters at the 1932 Winter Olympics
People from Eskilstuna
Sportspeople from Södermanland County
20th-century Swedish people